Kleinostheim is a community in the Aschaffenburg district in the Regierungsbezirk of Lower Franconia (Unterfranken) in Bavaria, Germany.

Geography

Location

The community of Kleinostheim is about 40 kilometers east southeast of Frankfurt am Main about a half hour drive from it.
Kleinostheim lies upstream from Frankfurt on the river Main. It is at the western edge of the Spessart range near Aschaffenburg. Like the nearby city of Mainz to the west, the 50th parallel north goes through the community.

Constituent communities
Kleinostheim's four Ortsteile are Kleinostheim, Waldstadt, Industriegebiet West and Wingert. The later three, however, are not officially recognized.

Community of Kleinostheim as a residential town
Owing to the favourable transport connections over an important north-south railway link and the Autobahnen A 3 and A 45, and because it lies on the Rhine-Danube waterway and in the middle of the Frankfurt Rhine Main Region, the community offers many advantages as a location. Kleinostheim benefits from lying near prosperous cities such as Frankfurt, Offenbach and Aschaffenburg by serving as a commuter town. Since the 1960s, the community's population has more than doubled from 4,000 to over 8,000.

History
Kleinostheim was most likely founded in the 6th century as Ossenheim by the Franks, and in 975, it had its first documentary mention. For almost a thousand years it was ecclesiastically and politically tightly bound with Saints Peter's and Alexander's Monastery in Aschaffenburg.

On 21 January 1945, the community suffered the most dreadful day in its history. In an air raid, more than 500 buildings were either damaged or utterly destroyed, and 61 people were killed. Commemorating this is a memorial site, renovated in 1995, at the graveyard.

In 1951, the third Saint Lawrence's Church (Laurentiuskirche) in the Catholic parish's over 1000-year history was consecrated. Nearby, in 1955, so was Saint Mark's Church (Markuskirche) for the new Evangelical parish.

In 1814, Kleinostheim passed to Bavaria, having belonged before that, since the 10th century, to the Electorate of Mainz.

Politics

Community council

The council is made up of 20 council members, not counting the mayor.

(as at municipal election held on 2 March 2008)

Coat of arms
The community's arms might be described thus: Gules a base wavy argent, above which an oaktree with five leaves Or between a wheel spoked of six and a spade blade in pale of the second.

Kleinostheim lies between the Main and the Spessart, which is well known for its oaks. This is symbolized by the oaktree in the arms. The wavy base refers to the community's geographical location between the Main and the Spessart. Kleinostheim is a very old community with an agricultural history going back more than twenty centuries. Standing for this is the spade blade, which was actually an archaeological find from Celtic times. The Wheel of Mainz and the tinctures gules and argent (red and silver) are taken from the arms borne by the Electorate of Mainz and recalls the community's former allegiance to this state.

The arms were conferred on 5 June 1975.

Town partnerships
 Bassens, Gironde, France since 1975

Personages
Franz Adolf Gräbner (b. 8 October 1944 in Hörstein; d. 2 April 2004 in Frankfurt) was a well known artistic painter. Gräbner was buried here, as it was also the last place where he lived. In the books that he had published, Mühlen und Landschaften der Heimat and Gemälde und Zeichnungen, some of his works are reproduced.

Transport
Railway station (Frankfurt - Aschaffenburg – Würzburg mainline)
Autobahn A 3, between Frankfurt (roughly 40 km away) and Würzburg (roughly 80 km away).
Connection to the A 45.

References

Aschaffenburg (district)